There are four venues that have been or are planned to be used for rugby sevens in the Summer Olympics:

Notes

References

Rugby sevens
Venues
Rugby union-related lists